Below shows the discography for the American rapper and Wu-Tang Clan member, Ol' Dirty Bastard.

Albums

Studio albums

Live albums

Compilation albums

Mixtapes

Extended plays

Singles

Other charted songs

Guest appearances
 1994 "Show & Prove" (from the Big Daddy Kane album Daddy's Home)
 1995 "Nuttin' But Flavor" (Funkmaster Flex single)
 1995 "Duel of the Iron Mic" (from the GZA album Liquid Swords)
 1995 "Fantasy" (from the Mariah Carey album Daydream)
 1996 "Woo-Hah!! Got You All in Check (The World Wide Remix)" (single by Busta Rhymes)
 1997 "Fix (Main Mix)" (single by Blackstreet)
1997 "Say Nothin'" (from the Omar Lye-Fook album This Is Not a Love Song)
 1997 "Hip Hop Drunkies" (from the Alkaholiks album Likwidation)
1997 "Strictly Hip-Hop" (Afro Jazz album Afrocalypse)
 1998 "If You Don't Know" (from the Killah Priest album Heavy Mental)
 1998 "Nowhere to Run" (from Chef Aid: The South Park Album)
 1998 "Shining Star" (from the Sunz Of Man album The Last Shall Be First)
 1998 "Got's Like Come On Thru" (The Big Hit soundtrack)
 1998 "Ghetto Supastar (That Is What You Are)" (single from Bulworth (soundtrack))
1998 "For the Money" (from the Mack 10 album The Recipe)
 1998 "Drug-Free" (unreleased, from the Deadly Venoms album Antidote)
 1999 "Bitches" (from the Insane Clown Posse album The Amazing Jeckel Brothers)
 1999 "Prepare for the Buddha Monk" (from the Popa Wu album Visions of the 10th Chamber)
 1999 "Kiss Of a Black Widow" (from the RZA album Bobby Digital In Stereo)
 1999 "Crash Your Crew" (from the GZA album Beneath the Surface)
 2000 "Violence" (from the Cam'ron album S.D.E.)
 2000 "Wreck (Mankind Theme)" (from WWF Aggression)
 2001 "Black Widow Pt. 2" (from the RZA album Digital Bullet)
 2001 "Sussudio" (from the album Urban Renewal)
 2002 "Doe Rae Wu" (from the Wu-Tang Killa Beez album The Sting)
 2003 "Pop Shit" (from The Neptunes album The Neptunes Present... Clones)
 2003 "We Pop" (from the RZA album Birth of a Prince)
 2003 "When You Hear That" (single by Beanie Sigel)
 2004 "Dirty" (from the Slum Village album Detroit Deli (A Taste of Detroit))
 2004 :"This is not" (from Mr R album Politikment Inccorekt)
 2004 "Dirty and Thirsty" (from the Melbeatz album Rapper's Delight)
 2004 "Everytime" (from Jon B. album Stronger Everyday)
 2004 "Some Girls (Dance With Women)" (bonus remix of the first single off the JC Chasez album Schizophrenic)
 2004 "Old Man" (from the Masta Killa album No Said Date)
 2005 "Blah-Blah-Blah" (from the Brooke Valentine Album Chain Letter)
 2005 "Break That" (from the Mathematics album The Problem)
 2005 "Keep the Receipt" (from the Kanye West Mixtape Freshman Adjustment)
 2005 "Thirsty" (from Blade Trinity OST)
 2005 "Specially Trained Ninja" (from the Zu Ninjaz album Now Justice)
 2005 "Where's Your Money?" (bonus track from the Busta Rhymes album The Big Bang)
 2006 "9 Milli Bros" (from the Ghostface album Fishscale)
 2006 "Where Brooklyn At?" (from the Bekay single "Where Brooklyn At?")
 2006 "Build Me Up" (from the Rhymefest album Blue Collar)
 2006 "Dirty Mef" (from the Method Man album 4:21...The Day After)
 2007 "Toxic" (Mark Ronson remix from the album Version)
 2008 "Do It For" (from the Brooklyn Zu and Chamber #9, Verse 32)
 2009 "Strange Enough" (on the collaboration-project "N.A.S.A., The Spirit of Apollo" featuring Karen O)
 2009 "Coochie" (with Ludacris on the collaboration-project "Blakroc, Blakroc")
 2011 "Not For Télévision Remix 2011" (from the Rockin' Squat album US Alien Chapter one)
 2022 "Forgiveless" (from the SZA album SOS)

References

Hip hop discographies